Muhammad Jasimuddin Rahmani is chief of the Al Qaeda affiliated, radical Islamist organization Ansarullah Bangla Team. He is currently in custody in Bangladesh charged under the Anti-Terrorism Act. He advocated the murder of atheists.

Militant activity
He was the Imam of Hatembagh Jame Masjid in Dhaka, Bangladesh. He studied in madrasas in Bangladesh and outside the country. He was inspired by Al-Qaeda leader Anwar al-Awlaki. He used to preach his message on a website called "Ansarulla Bangla Team" whose servers are located in Pakistan. Ansarullah Bangla Team was responsible for the murder of a number of secular activist in Bangladesh. He has a madrassa located in Mohammadpur, Dhaka. The Madrasa was visited by students from Dhaka University and North South University. Quazi Mohammad Rezwanul Ahsan Nafis was a regular at the Madrasa, he is currently in prison in the United States for trying to bomb the Federal Reserve Bank of New York.

Arrest
Muhammad Jasimuddin Rahmani was arrested on 12 August 2013 from Barguna, Bangladesh along with 30 members of his organisation for inciting people to commit violent Jihad. He is currently serving a five-year prison sentence.

References

Bangladeshi Islamists
Sunni Islamists
Bangladeshi male criminals
Living people
Year of birth missing (living people)
People convicted on terrorism charges
Leaders of Islamic terror groups